Sportclub Hansa Bremen was a German association football club based in the Hanseatic city of Bremen. Established in 1898, the team played in the Verband Bremer Ballspiel Vereine and was a founding member of the DFB (Deutscher Fußball Bund, en:German Football Association) at Leipzig in 1900. The club disappeared from the German football scene after just two seasons in the VBBV.

Football clubs in Germany
Defunct football clubs in Germany
Sport in Bremen (city)
Defunct football clubs in Bremen (state)
Association football clubs established in 1898
1898 establishments in Germany